Nicolasa Quintremán (December 4, 1939 - December 24, 2013) was a Chilean Pehuenche activist from the community of Ralco Lepoy in the commune of Alto Biobío. Together with her older sister Berta, she was known nationally and internationally for her fierce opposition to the construction of Endesa's Ralco Hydroelectric Plant. As part of the organization Mapu Domuche Newén (Mapuche language) (Women with the strength of the land) her actions marked the beginning of social struggles in the face of the environmental and social impact that large initiatives of this type can generate in the country.

Biography
Nicolasa Quintremán Calpán was born in Alto Biobío, Chile, December 4, 1939. She belonged to the Pehuenche community of Ralco Lepoy, where she was one of the architects of several demonstrations in Santiago and Concepción against the power plant, and participated in several international forums where she explained the implications of the project for the Pehuenche of Alto Biobío, such as the one organized at the Human Rights Commission of the European Parliament. In addition, she filed a lawsuit against the company and the National Environmental Commission.

On December 24, 2013, Quintremán's body was found floating in the murky waters of the artificial reservoir of the Ralco dam, the same one for which she achieved public notoriety by tenaciously opposing its construction. Although the Forensic Medical Service stated that Quintremán died from drowning as a result of an accidental fall, for many, the accident thesis left room for doubt.

Awards and honours
In 2000, along with her sister, Quintremán received the Petra Kelly Prize in Germany:—

References

1939 births
2013 deaths
People from Bío Bío Province
Chilean activists
South American pacifists
Mapuche groups
Deaths by drowning